Thunderstorm is the debut album by the Danish speed metal/power metal band Iron Fire. The album was produced and mixed by Tommy Hansen and released in June 2000 on Noise Records.

Track listing
"Final Crusade" - 4:37
"When the Heroes Fall" - 4:48
"Rise of the Rainbow" - 4:21
"Metal Victory" - 4:19
"Thunderstorm" - 4:46
"Behind the Mirror" - 4:26
"Warriors of Steel" - 6:35
"Battle of Freedom" - 4:59
"Glory to the King" - 4:57
"Angel of Light" - 4:48
"Until the End" - 3:55
"Riding Free" - 4:54
"Under Jolly Roger" (Running Wild cover) - Limited edition only - 4:21

Album line-up
Martin Steene - Vocals
Kristian H. Martinsen- Guitars (Drums on "Under Jolly Roger")
Kristian "Iver" Iversen - Guitars
Jakob Lykkebo- Bass
Gunnar Olsen- Drums

Guest musician
Tommy Hansen - Keyboards / Harmonica / Backing Vocals

References

2000 debut albums
Iron Fire albums
Noise Records albums